Bernhard Flies (born about 1770 in Berlin) was a German amateur composer and a doctor of medicine.

Little is known about Flies. He composed some piano pieces and songs. He is best known for the romantic music to the lullaby Schlafe, mein Prinzchen, schlaf ein, (Sleep, my little prince, go to sleep) attributed to him, also known as Das Wiegenlied (the Cradle Song), from the theatre play "Esther" written by Friedrich Wilhelm Gotter (1746–1797). Recent research suggests that the song was originally composed by Johann Friedrich Anton Fleischmann. For a long time, the composition was mistakenly attributed to Wolfgang Amadeus Mozart (K. 350 in the Köchel-Verzeichnis).

References

External links
 German and English texts of the lullaby, Czech translation
 Music of the lullaby (in MID format)
 
 

1770s births
Year of birth uncertain
Year of death unknown
German male composers
18th-century German composers
18th-century German male musicians
18th-century German physicians